"Way Back" is a song written by Jerry Fuller, and recorded by American country music artist John Conlee.  It was released in June 1984 as the fourth single from the album In My Eyes.  The song reached #4 on the Billboard Hot Country Singles & Tracks chart.

Chart performance

References

1984 singles
John Conlee songs
Songs written by Jerry Fuller
MCA Records singles
1984 songs